Zoran Kalinić (born July 20, 1958) is a Serbian retired table tennis player who represented SFR Yugoslavia (1976–1991) and FR Yugoslavia (1991–1998).

Table tennis career
He began playing table tennis in 1969. He turned pro in 1976. He won 15 medals in European and World championships.

His four World Championship medals included a gold medal in the doubles at the 1983 World Table Tennis Championships with Dragutin Šurbek.

He also won two English Open titles.

He was nominated for the Sportsperson of Yugoslavia in 1994. He is the current national association president.

Biography
He is the father of basketball player Nikola Kalinić (b. 1991).

See also
 List of table tennis players
 List of World Table Tennis Championships medalists

References

Further reading

External links

Living people
1958 births
Sportspeople from Subotica
Serbian male table tennis players
Yugoslav table tennis players
Olympic table tennis players of Yugoslavia
Olympic table tennis players as Independent Olympic Participants
Table tennis players at the 1988 Summer Olympics
Table tennis players at the 1992 Summer Olympics